Sargocentron microstoma, the fine-lined squirrelfish, slender squirrelfish or smallmouth squirrelfish, is a member of the family Holocentridae. It has a wide range throughout the Indo-Pacific from the Chagos Archipelago, Seychelles, and the Maldives to the Hawaiian Islands, Line Islands, and the Tuamotus Archipelago, north to the Ryukyu Islands and Bonin Islands, south to Austral Islands and throughout Micronesia. During the day it hides in crevices, especially near Acropora and Pocillopora. It is a nocturnal predator, feeding on crustaceans, worms, and fishes. It can reach sizes of up to  TL and has a venomous preopercle.

References

External links
 
 
 

microstoma
Fish described in 1859
Taxa named by Albert Günther
Fish of the Indian Ocean
Fish of the Pacific Ocean